Bezirk Knittelfeld was a district of the state of Styria in Austria. On January 1, 2012 Knittelfeld District and Judenburg District were merged to Murtal District.

Municipalities
Towns (Städte) are indicated in boldface; market towns (Marktgemeinden) in italics; suburbs, hamlets and other subdivisions of a municipality are indicated in small characters.
 Apfelberg
Landschach
 Feistritz bei Knittelfeld
Altendorf, Moos
 Flatschach
 Gaal
Bischoffeld, Gaalgraben, Graden, Ingering II, Puchschachen, Schattenberg
 Großlobming
 Kleinlobming
Mitterlobming
 Knittelfeld
 Kobenz
Hautzenbichl, Neuhautzenbichl, Oberfarrach, Raßnitz, Reifersdorf, Unterfarrach
 Rachau
Glein, Mitterbach
 Sankt Lorenzen bei Knittelfeld
Fötschach, Gottsbach, Leistach, Pichl, Preg, Preggraben, Ritzendorf, Sankt Benedikten, Schütt, Untermur
 Sankt Marein bei Knittelfeld
Feistritzgraben, Fentsch, Fressenberg, Greith, Hof, Laas, Mitterfeld, Prankh, Sankt Martha, Wasserleith, Kniepaß
 Sankt Margarethen bei Knittelfeld
Gobernitz, Kroisbach, Obermur, Ugendorf
 Seckau
Dürnberg, Seckau, Neuhofen, Sonnwenddorf
 Spielberg
Einhörn, Ingering I, Laing, Lind, Maßweg, Pausendorf, Sachendorf, Schönberg, Spielberg, Weyern

Districts of Styria
Murtal District